Yuliya Piatrouna Khitraya (Łacinka: Julija Piatroŭna Chitraja; born 11 September 1989) is a Belarusian swimmer, who specialized in sprint freestyle events. She won a bronze medal, as a member of the Belarusian swimming team, in the women's 4×50 m freestyle at the 2012 European Short Course Swimming Championships in Chartres, France.

Khitraya represented Belarus at the 2012 Summer Olympics in London, where she qualified for the women's 4 × 100 m freestyle relay, along with her teammates Aksana Dziamidava, Sviatlana Khakhlova, and double Olympic silver medalist Aliaksandra Herasimenia. Swimming the anchor leg, Khitraya posted her time of 55.92 seconds, and the Belarusian team went on to finish the first heat in seventh place and thirteenth overall, setting a new national record time of 3:40.67.

References

External links
NBC Olympics Profile

1989 births
Living people
Olympic swimmers of Belarus
Swimmers at the 2012 Summer Olympics
Swimmers at the 2016 Summer Olympics
Belarusian female freestyle swimmers
Belarusian female medley swimmers
People from Baranavichy
Sportspeople from Brest Region